Steve Griggs is a Canadian sports executive. He currently serves as the president and CEO of the Tampa Bay Lightning of the National Hockey League. (NHL).

References

External links
Steve Griggs's staff profile at Eliteprospects.com

Year of birth missing (living people)
Living people
National Hockey League team presidents
Tampa Bay Lightning executives